Ben O'Donnell (born 14 August 1995) is an Australian rugby union player, currently playing for Pro14 and European Rugby Champions Cup side Connacht. He plays in the  wing.

O’Donnell has represented the Australia national rugby sevens team since 2017 at 21 competitions.

References

External links
itsrugby.co.uk Profile
Rugby.com.au Profile

1995 births
Living people
Australian rugby union players
Connacht Rugby players
Rugby union wings
Rugby union players from Sydney
ACT Brumbies players